KLLL-FM (96.3 MHz) is a country music station licensed and broadcast in Lubbock, Texas, owned by Alpha Media Group through licensee Alpha Media Licensee LLC.  Its studios are located in south Lubbock on Avenue Q west of Interstate 27, and its transmitter is located separately two miles away south of the studios.

KBFM, the forerunner to KLLL, began in 1958 as an easy listening station. It transmitted an SCA (Subsidiary Communications Authority) to transmit Muzak brand background music. The transmitter was located at the Great Plains Life Building (now known as Metro Tower) at Broadway and avenue M. Studios were originally at 2442 14th street, but were shortly moved to the fifth floor of the same building as the transmitter and antenna. The station was founded by a Mr. Blankenship. KLLL (AM) was in the same building with its studios on the top (20th) floor. In 1968, KLLL's owners, the Corbins, bought KBFM. It kept its call letters, stayed easy listening by day but carried the country format of KLLL at night when the 1460 AM daytimer signed off.

KBFM changed to KLLL in 1971, the year after the 1970 Lubbock tornado. The studio building was damaged and the station relocated to the former KSEL studios on East Broadway; KSEL had moved to 84th and L where at the site of the new channel 28 KSEL-TV (now KAMC). KLLL moved to 50th and L in 1976.

The Corbin family hired Jerry "Bo" Coleman as a radio host and made him a stockholder. In 1978, the Corbins sold KLLL AM/FM to Lubbock County Broadcasting, owned by James Thrash and John Frankhouser. Thrash and Frankhouseer in turn sold the company in 1987 to Pinnacle Broadcasting.

KLLL is currently owned by a privately held company Alpha Media Group.

References

External links
KLLL-FM's official website

LLL-FM
Country radio stations in the United States
Privately held companies based in Texas
Alpha Media radio stations